Orcoquisac may refer to:
 The Akokisa tribe of Texas, United States
 El Orcoquisac Archeological District, a site near modern Wallisville, Texas which was once a French and Spanish post for trading with the Akokisa